Shleifer is a form of the German surname Schleifer. Notable people with the surname include:

Andrei Shleifer (born 1961),  Russian-American economist
Scott Shleifer (born 1977), American billionaire hedge fund manager
Shlomo Shleifer (1889–1957), Rabbi from Moscow

German-language surnames
Yiddish-language surnames